Kindness for Weakness is a studio album by American rapper Homeboy Sandman. It was released by Stones Throw Records on May 6, 2016. Music videos were created for "Talking (Bleep)", "Nonbelievers", and "Eyes".

Critical reception

Marcus J. Moore of Pitchfork gave the album a 6.7 out of 10, writing, "The album feels resolute, though it occasionally suffers from brief lapses that derail the proceedings."

HipHopDX named it one of the "Most Slept-On Rap Albums of 2016".

Track listing

References

External links
 
 

2016 albums
Homeboy Sandman albums
Stones Throw Records albums
Albums produced by Large Professor
Albums produced by RJD2